Birdemic 2: The Resurrection is a 2013 American satirical romantic thriller-horror film directed and story & screenplay by James Nguyen and produced by Jeff Gross. The sequel to Nguyen's 2010 film Birdemic: Shock and Terror, which has been considered one of the worst films of all time, Birdemic 2 features self-referential humor about the reception of the previous film. Taking place two years after the first Birdemic, the film follows another mass bird attack caused by global warming, this time in Hollywood.

Plot 
Bill, an independent film director, discovers waitress Gloria in a Hollywood eatery and casts her in the lead role of Kim in his new film Sunset Dreams, which is financed by his friend Rod, a Silicon Valley entrepreneur, and Rod's girlfriend, Nathalie. Shortly into production of Sunset Dreams, a toxic rain falls on Hollywood which causes preserved killer birds and cavemen to emerge from the La Brea Tar Pits and zombies to come to life in a nearby cemetery. Bill, Gloria, Rod, and Nathalie make their way around Hollywood with a dwindling band of survivors, fighting off the various threats before the birds eventually cease attacking and fly away.

Cast

Production 
Birdemic 2 was announced in April 2011, along with news that Bagh would reprise his role from the first film. Production began on February 4, 2012. Nguyen included long scenes of dancing in order to satisfy fans of his first film, who he said wanted romantic content; Nguyen himself sees the film as a romantic thriller. Nguyen was influenced by concerns about global warming, which he said was the cause of the bird and zombie attacks in the film.  The film was shot in 3D, which Nguyen said he mastered during shooting. Shooting in 3D slowed down production, but Nguyen said he believed it would bring more people to the sequel.

Release 
A tie-in video game was released in October 2012.  Starting on April 16, 2013, Chill.com exclusively offered the film via video on demand for 90 days before it was released to other services.  It was released on DVD in October 2013.

Reception 
Dennis Harvey of Variety wrote, "Nguyen's partial self-awareness of his new movie's camp value ... only makes it an effortful, half-understood in-joke rather than the guiltily pleasurable unintentional joke that was Birdemic: Shock and Terror."  Rod Lott of the Oklahoma Gazette wrote, "What keeps Birdemic 2 from reaching the first film's level of fun is Nguyen's penchant for treating this go-round like a greatest-hits reel."  HorrorNews.net rated it 0/5 stars and called it the worst film of the year.

Sequel 

In a 2016 Vice interview, Nguyen said that he is hoping to eventually make Birdemic 3: Sea Eagle, which would be his last film. In October 2016, an Indiegogo campaign was raised in order to finance the third film of the series. The funding was eventually closed, with only roughly $596 out of the desired $500,000 raised. Despite this, it was announced in March 2021 that production on the third installment had begun with a planned release in late 2022. The poster for the film was released on November 19, 2021 through Moviehead Pictures’ official Twitter page. The film itself was released on several streaming platforms on January 24, 2023.

References

External links 
 
 

2013 films
2013 3D films
2013 horror films
2013 horror thriller films
American 3D films
American horror thriller films
American independent films
Horror films about birds
American natural horror films
2010s romantic thriller films
American zombie films
American romantic thriller films
2010s English-language films
2010s American films